A Mix Up In Hearts is a 1917 silent comedy film featuring Oliver Hardy. The film was produced by the Vim Comedy Company.

Cast
 Ethel Marie Burton (as Ethel Burton)
 Oliver Hardy (as Babe Hardy)

See also
 List of American films of 1917

External links

1917 films
1917 short films
American silent short films
American black-and-white films
1917 comedy films
Films directed by Oliver Hardy
Silent American comedy films
American comedy short films
1910s American films